So Young 2: Never Gone, commonly known as Never Gone, is a 2016 Chinese romantic drama film based on the popular novel by Xin Yiwu. The film is directed by Zhou Tuoru, produced by Zhang Yibai and stars Kris Wu and Liu Yifei. Though the stories are unrelated, the film was promoted as the sequel to 2013 youth romance film So Young, and released in China on 8 July 2016.

Plot
Su Yunjin (Liu Yifei) and Cheng Zheng (Kris Wu) meet in high school. Su Yunjin is a transfer student from a struggling family, while rich heir Cheng Zheng is the popular star student. Cheng Zheng falls in love with Su Yunjin and pursues her through college, even when they study and live in different cities. Su Yunjin is worried about the difference in their economic status, though this doesn't worry Cheng Zheng. She decides to give it a chance and the two move in together after graduation. 

Two years pass in bliss; however, the issue of money drives a wedge between them, as Su Yunjin refuses to take Cheng Zheng's financial help for her mother's operation, and Cheng Zheng is angered when she goes instead to her close friend and former suitor Shen Ju An (Kimi Qiao) for help. The two break up, and Cheng Zheng moves to America to help with his family's company.

After some more time passes, Su Yunjin realizes she truly loves Cheng Zheng and surprisingly, for the first time, she is the one to seek out Cheng Zheng rather than the other way around.

Cast
Kris Wu as Cheng Zheng
Liu Yifei as Su Yunjin
Kimi Qiao as Shen Ju'an
Li Meng as Mo Yuhua
Jin Shijia as Zhou Ziyi
Li Qin as Meng Xue
Hao Shaowen as Song Ming

Reception
The film  topped the country's box office charts, raking in 70 million yuan (S$14.1 million) on the first day. It grossed  in China and  worldwide.

It received negative reviews, particularly for its lack of substantial plot, poor characterization and the lead actors' performance. The Hollywood Reporter called the film a "clunky, retrograde imitation of that coming-of-age exploration of romance and the folly of youth".

References

External links

2016 romantic drama films
Chinese romantic drama films
Films based on Chinese novels
Films shot in Shanghai
2016 films
Wuzhou Film Distribution films
Huaxia Film Distribution films
Chinese teen films
2010s Mandarin-language films